Chad Valley is a small area of Birmingham, England, located between Harborne and Edgbaston. It contains a fish pond and the Chad Vale Primary School.

It takes its name from the Chad Brook, a tributary of the River Rea and in turn gave it to the Chad Valley toy company.

Areas of Birmingham, West Midlands
Harborne